A macroregion is a geopolitical subdivision that encompasses several traditionally or politically defined regions or countries. The meaning may vary, with the common denominator being cultural, economical, historical or social similarity within a macroregion. The term is often used in the context of globalization.

It may refer to various kinds of grouping of nation states basing on geographical proximity.
In Romania,  macroregiuni ("macroregions") are a higher-level subdivision of the country.
Sometimes  the Greater Region of Saarland-Lorraine-Luxembourg -Rhineland-Palatinate-Wallonia-French Community of Belgium- and German-speaking Community of Belgium, which has not found a specific shortcut yet, is called "the macroregion".
Physiographic macroregions of China.
Regions of Brazil are often referred to as "macroregions", to avoid the confusion of the common word "region".

Other uses
The term "macroregion" may be also used in the context of natural regions, like in Slovenia.

See also
 Mesoregion
 Microdistrict, Soviet and Central European urban housing schemes
 Microregion

References

Political geography
Globalization
Regions